Estadio Presbítero Bartolomé Grella is a multi-use stadium in Paraná, Argentina.  It is currently used mostly for football matches and is the home ground of Patronato de Paraná.  The stadium has a capacity of 23,500 spectators and it opened in 1956.

References

Presbitero Bartolome Grella
Buildings and structures in Entre Ríos Province
Paraná, Entre Ríos